Country Songs, Old and New is the debut album by the progressive bluegrass band Country Gentlemen, recorded in 1960 and reissued in 1991.

Track listing 
Side 1
 "Roving Gambler" – 3:07
 "The Little Sparrow" – 3:31
 "Drifting Too Far" – 3:27
 "Weeping Willow" (A.P. Carter) – 2:01
 "Tomorrow's My Wedding Day" – 2:09
 "The Story Of Charlie Lawson" – 3:03
 "Turkey Knob" (Eddie Adcock) – 2:18
 "Paul And Silas" – 2:26
Side 2
"Ellen Smith" – 2:13
 "The Long Black Veil" (Danny Dill, Marijohn Wilkin) – 3:35
 "Honky Tonk Rag" (John Duffey) – 2:26
 "Jesse James" – 2:35
 "Have Thine Own Way" – 2:51
 "A Good Woman's Love" (Cy Coben) – 3:25
 "The Double Eagle" (Josef Wagner) – 2:54
 "Darling Alalee" – 2:04

Personnel 
 Charlie Waller - guitar, vocals
 John Duffey - mandolin, vocals
 Eddie Adcock - banjo, vocals
 Jim Cox - bass, vocals

References

External links 
 

1960 debut albums
Folkways Records albums
The Country Gentlemen albums
Smithsonian Folkways albums
Albums produced by Charlie Waller (American musician)
Albums produced by John Duffey
Albums produced by Eddie Adcock